Port Phillip Prison is a maximum security prison located at Truganina, Victoria, Australia. It is Victoria's largest maximum security prison, able to accommodate up to 1117 prisoners. The prison is privately operated on behalf of the Government of Victoria by G4S Australia Pty Ltd.

Construction and history
Construction began in 1994 and was completed in 1996. Originally called Port Phillip Correctional Centre, the facility was the third privately operated prison to open in Victoria. It received its first prisoners on 10 September 1997.
General Manager  was forced to resign in April 2016 due to a Corrections Victoria investigation into gun licences.

Accommodation units
The prison consists of 13 accommodation units including a youth unit named Penhyn for young adult inmates aged 18–25 who are first time offenders only with no criminal record. All other under 25 prisoners are sent to mainstream units. The induction unit named Matilda is divided into 2 and all prisoners spend time there before being located to other accommodation  units. Cells within the units have a shower, hand basin, toilet, desk, chair, television, storage shelves, intercom and bed.

The prison operates a 20-bed inpatient hospital unit.

Notable prisoners
 
Julian Knight, perpetrator of the 1987 Hoddle Street massacre.
Jason Joseph Roberts, convicted of the Silk-Miller police murders.
Blair Cottrell, Chairman of the United Patriots Front, convicted of stalking and arson.
Peter Dupas, convicted serial killer.

References

G4S
1997 establishments in Australia
Prisons in Melbourne
Maximum security prisons in Australia
Private prisons in Australia
Government buildings completed in 1997
Buildings and structures in the City of Wyndham